The twins Sanchai and Sonchat Ratiwatana defeated Frederik Nielsen and Yuichi Sugita 6–3, 7–5 in the final.

Seeds

Draw

Draw

References
 Doubles Draw

Doubles
Chang-Sat Bangkok Open - Doubles
 in Thai tennis